Gyan de Regt (born 14 August 2002) is a Dutch football player. He plays as a left winger for Eredivisie club Vitesse.

Club career
He made his Eredivisie debut for Vitesse on 13 March 2022 in a game against Heracles Almelo.

References

External links
 

2002 births
People from Papendrecht
Footballers from South Holland
Living people
Dutch footballers
Netherlands youth international footballers
Association football forwards
SBV Vitesse players
Eredivisie players